MacDonald in Song (sometimes referred to as Jeanette MacDonald in Song) is a 1939 album by American actress Jeanette MacDonald, released by RCA Victor.

Background 
Jeanette MacDonald had appeared in Hollywood musical movies throughout the 1930s and was one of the most popular American artists in the world. She had toured France and England in 1931 and 1933, and would tour the United States in 1939, starting from March. The album was recorded later that year between September 11 and 16 at the Hollywood Recording Studio in Los Angeles with an orchestra, conducted by Giuseppe Bamboschek. Bamboschek performed the piano on four tracks, as well as MacDonald's husband Gene Raymond (whose two tracks were not released).

The album was released with four 10-inch discs.

Track listing 
Ten songs feature on the track, despite 17 songs being recorded (some were additional takes) during the session.

Reception 
MacDonald in Song received mixed reviews: Baltimore's The Evening Sun noted the "[s]loppy diction, a shallow, edgy voice quality and a banal lack of contrast in songs of varying mood[,]" and that "The red-haired soprano's film following will probably find these records pleasantly entertaining, but the regular concert record purchaser will not." D. S. Steinfirst ended his review with "Surprisingly enough, the Faust arias are above the average" after writing "Most of the singing is undistinguished." However, The Evening Sun dubbed "Ave Maria" the best track, which J. D. Callaghan agreed with, adding "although Miss MacDonald also is effective in two arias from the opera Faust."

Notes

Citations

Bibliography

External links 
  by Discogs

1940 albums
RCA Victor albums